Artem Anatolevich Klimenko (born January 10, 1994) is a Russian professional basketball player for Zenit Saint Petersburg of the VTB United League.

Professional career
In 2011, Klimenko joined BC Avtodor Saratov.

In March 2014, Klimenko announced his intentions to enter the 2014 NBA draft. In May 2014, Avtodor added a buy-out clause to his contract, and he later travelled to the United States to attend various NBA workouts. On June 26, 2014, he went undrafted in the 2014 draft.

In the 2015–16 season, Klimenko won the VTB United League Young Player of the Year award.

Early December 2016, Klimenko signed a contract with the Russian team UNICS Kazan until the end of the 2016-2017 season. On July 10, 2018, Klimenko signed a three-year contract with UNICS.

On July 4, 2022, he has signed with Zenit Saint Petersburg of the VTB United League.

References

External links
Profile at Eurobasket.com

1994 births
Living people
BC Avtodor Saratov players
BC UNICS players
Centers (basketball)
Sportspeople from Mariupol
Russian men's basketball players
Naturalised citizens of Russia